La settimana della Sfinge (internationally released as The Week of the Sphinx) is a 1990 Italian comedy-drama film co-written and directed by Daniele Luchetti. For her role Margherita Buy was awarded best actress at the San Sebastián International Film Festival.

Plot    
Gloria is a young waitress who works in a restaurant, has a passion for puzzles and daydreams; the girl delights, causing the ire of her boss, in posing various riddles to the customers, without however anyone being able to solve them. One day Aeolus arrives for lunch, an antenna player with a reputation as a womanizer, and manages to win Gloria's heart; but Aeolus, allergic to lasting relationships, leaves the girl after only one night together, without even saying goodbye.

Gloria, seduced and abandoned, quits her job and sets out in search of her beloved. He travels all over Italy, crossing seas and mountains, beaches and convents, getting to know all kinds of humanity. After a long chase, the girl finally manages to find Aeolus, who, struck by her determination, falls in love with her in turn. But by now it's too late: Gloria, having reached her goal, runs away, returning to be a waitress and to dream of a new adventure.

Cast 
Margherita Buy as Gloria
Paolo Hendel as Eolo
Silvio Orlando as Ministro 
Isaac George as Ferruccio 
Delia Boccardo as Sara 
Roberto Nobile as Police Commissioner
Corso Salani as Gommista

See also    
 List of Italian films of 1990

References

External links

1990 films
Films directed by Daniele Luchetti
1990 comedy-drama films
Commedia all'italiana
1990s Italian-language films
1990s Italian films